See also: Nabao (disambiguation)
Nabão may refer to:
 Nabão River
 3 Léguas do Nabão (List of half marathon races)